The NASCAR Manufacturers' Championship is awarded by NASCAR to the most successful manufacturer over a season, as determined by a points system based on race results. The Manufacturers' Championship was first awarded in 1952, to Hudson.

Different car make/engine combinations are considered to be different manufacturers for the purposes of the Championship. Up to the 2013 season, the Manufacturer's Championship points were calculated by adding points scored in each race by the highest finishing driver for that manufacturer. The winning manufacturer earns nine points, while the second-highest finishing manufacturer earns six points. The third-highest manufacturer earns four points, and the fourth-highest three points. For the 2014 season on, NASCAR made the decision to mirror the points structure of the Owner's Championships. Under this system the highest finishing driver for each manufacturer earns the same number of points the representing team earned during the race, including bonus points for wins and laps lead.

In the 61 seasons the championship has been awarded, only nine different manufacturers have won it. Chevrolet has been the most successful, with 42 titles. The second most successful is Ford, with 17 titles.

History
Dozens of vehicle manufacturers have had cars in one of the three top NASCAR series since the inception of the Manufacturers' Championship title, only nine have won  a title. To date, all but Toyota have been American-owned companies.

Championship winners (totals)

Manufacturer Representation
In the beginning, teams received little support from the car companies themselves, but by the mid 1960s, teams began creating partnerships with American manufacturers to provide factory support. Chrysler, Ford and General Motors were the primary, if not only, competitors for much of NASCAR's history. Plymouth achieved some success during the 1960s, but abandoned the sport in 1977. In the next decade, Ford's Mercury brand left, as did Chrysler's remaining brand in Dodge. General Motors had been using four different brands in NASCAR up to 1991, but within three years, Buick and Oldsmobile were no longer represented on the grid. Pontiac survived until 2004, leaving only Chevrolet as the lone General Motors division. In 2007 when Japanese manufacturer Toyota joined, it became the first new manufacturer since 1971. Chrysler's Dodge brand returned after a 15-year hiatus in 2001, but departed after 2012, leaving just Chevrolet, Ford and Toyota.

Chevrolet is the most successful manufacturer, having won 824 races and 41 manufacturers championships. Ford is second with 715 victories and 17 manufacturers championships, while Dodge is third in wins with 217, Plymouth is fourth with 191. Toyota currently ranks 5th all time, with 166 victories. Pontiac is ranked sixth with 154.  (Wins as of 7/4/22)

Cup Series

Results by season

Xfinity Series

Results by season

Truck Series

References

External links
2007 Manufacturers Championship, all-time Manufacturers Championships, and all-time Manufacturers Wins

Manufacturer's Championship
Manufacturers' champions